Pseudochromis punctatus, the blackback dottyback, is a species of ray-finned fish in the family Pseudochromidae, native to the Western Indian Ocean.

References

punctatus
Taxa named by Adolf Kotthaus
Fish described in 1970